Elisabeth Croft (22 September 1907 – 13 January 2003) was an English actress, known for playing Edith Tatum in the ITV soap opera Crossroads.

She is not to be confused with another English actress, Elizabeth Croft.

Personal life
Croft was born on 22 September 1907 in Windermere. Withdrawn as a child, she nonetheless chose to be an actress. In the 1930s she landed roles in repertory theatre and co-starred with Seymour Hicks in Vintage Wine in the Daly's Theatre, 1934.  She was married and had a son and a daughter.  Croft died on 13 January 2003; on that day a new version of Crossroads was released.

Career
 
In 1966, Croft landed her first television role, a part in the ITV soap opera Crossroads, playing Miss Tatum. The soap originally featured actress Beryl Johnstone as postmistress Kitty Jarvis, sister of the series lead, motel owner Meg Richardson (Noele Gordon). Following Johnstone's death in 1969, the role of Miss Tatum was increased and she was coaxed from her life as a recluse and took over the running of the shop from Kitty, becoming one of the show's leading peripheral characters as the location increasingly became a focal point in stories. Croft later summed up her character: "Miss Tatum didn't suffer fools gladly and was a bit sharp at times, but she was a wonderful character". The role of Miss Tatum was quietly phased out following producer Reg Watson's departure. Croft left the series by 1979. Croft said of the show, "I suppose you would call it a quiet, humdrum show".

In 1940, Croft began working for Royal Shakespeare Company, Stratford-upon-Avon. She appeared in many plays whilst there, such as Romeo and Juliet and The Merry Wives of Windsor. She appeared in the Armchair Thriller production The Limbo Connection. Her last appearance in television was in the BAFTA award winning The Dress in 1984, her last role before a long retirement. Whilst in the cast for The Dress, it won a BAFTA award in 1984.

Filmography
Television

Film

Stage/Theatre

References

External links

20th-century English actresses
English television actresses
English stage actresses
English soap opera actresses
1907 births
2003 deaths
People from Windermere, Cumbria